Prangli  is a village in Kanepi Parish, Põlva County in southeastern Estonia.

Painter Julie Wilhelmine Hagen-Schwarz (1824–1902) was born in Prangli village.

References

 

Villages in Põlva County
Kreis Dorpat